Estradiol diundecylate (brand name Estrolent), or estradiol diundecanoate, also known as 17β-estradiol 3,17β-diundecylate, is an estrogen and an estrogen ester – specifically, the 3,17β-diundecylate ester of estradiol – which has been marketed in Romania. It was described, along with a variety of other estradiol esters such as estradiol undecylate, by Karl Junkmann of Schering AG in 1953.

See also
 Estradiol diundecylate/hydroxyprogesterone heptanoate/testosterone cyclohexylpropionate
 Estradiol diundecylenate
 Estradiol undecylate
 List of estrogen esters § Estradiol esters

References

Abandoned drugs
Estradiol esters
Undecanoate esters